Siro is a given name and a surname. People with the name include:

Given name
 Siro the Epicurean, philosopher who lived in Naples
 Siro Baroni (1678–1746), Italian painter
 Siro Bianchi (1924–1992), French cyclist
 Siro Darino (born 1976), Argentine football player
 Siro Lombardini (1924—2013), Italian economist and politician
 Siro López (born 1956), Spanish journalist
 Siro Marcellini (born 1921), Italian director and screenwriter
 Siro Meli (1946–2018), Italian rower

Surname
 Fernando Siro (1931–2006), Argentine film actor, film director and screenwriter

Fictional characters
 Siro (fictional character)

Latin masculine given names
Italian masculine given names